Michelle Grabner (born 1962 in Oshkosh, Wisconsin) is an artist, curator, and critic based in Wisconsin. She is the Crown Family Professor of Art at the School of the Art Institute of Chicago where she has taught since 1996. She has curated several important exhibitions, including the 2014 Whitney Biennial at the Whitney Museum of American Art along with Anthony Elms and Stuart Comer, and FRONT International,  the 2016 Portland Biennial at the Oregon Contemporary, a triennial exhibition in Cleveland, Ohio in 2018. In 2014, Grabner was named one of the 100 most powerful women in art and in 2019, she was named a 2019 National Academy of Design's Academician, a lifetime honor. In 2021, Grabner was named a Guggenheim Fellow by The John Simon Guggenheim Memorial Foundation.

Life
Grabner received a B.F.A. (painting and drawing) in 1984 and an M.A. in art history in 1987 from the University of Wisconsin–Milwaukee. Her MA thesis and exhibition was titled Postmodernism: A Spectacle of Reflexivity and included work by Richard Prince, Sherrie Levine, and Kay Rosen among others. She received an M.F.A. from Northwestern University in 1990. She is the Crown Family Professor of Art at the School of the Art Institute of Chicago, where she has been teaching since 1996. In addition, Grabner has also held teaching appointments at The University of Wisconsin-Madison, Cranbrook Academy of Art, Yale Norfolk, Bard College's Milton Avery Graduate School of Arts, and Skowhegan School of Painting and Sculpture, Maine.

Work
Her work is in the collection of the Art Museum of West Virginia University, Morgantown; Walker Art Center, Minneapolis; the Milwaukee Art Museum; the Museum of Contemporary Art, Chicago; DaimlerChrysler Collection, Berlin; Musée d'art moderne Grand-Duc Jean, Luxembourg; Smithsonian American Art Museum, Washington, DC; the Indianapolis Museum of Art; and the Victoria and Albert Museum, London. The Museum of Contemporary Art Cleveland presented her first solo retrospective, Michelle Grabner, "I Work From Home", November 1, 2013 - February 16, 2014. The Indianapolis Museum of Art, MOCA Cleveland, Illinois State Galleries, and INOVA at University of Wisconsin-Milwaukee have each hosted survey exhibitions of Grabner’s work.

Grabner co-curated the 2014 Whitney Museum Biennial and curated the 2016 Portland Biennial. She was the Artistic Director for the inaugural exhibition, FRONT International, the 2018 Cleveland Triennial for Contemporary Art, titled An American City.

Writing
Her reviews are regularly published in X-tra and Artforum. In 2010, Mary Jane Jacob and Grabner co-edited THE STUDIO READER, published by the University of Chicago Press. In 2018, Grabner edited An American City: Front International, a two-volume exhibition catalog published by the Cleveland Museum of Art.

The Suburban and The Poor Farm
With her husband Brad Killam, she founded The Suburban in Oak Park, Illinois in 1999 which hosted a range of international contemporary art. In 2015, The Suburban began programming exhibitions in Milwaukee’s Walker’s Point neighborhood. In 2009 Grabner and Killam opened The Poor Farm in rural Waupaca County, Wisconsin. The Poor Farm is dedicated to annual historical and contemporary exhibitions, lectures, performances, publications, screenings and alternative educational programs.

References

Further reading 
 Relyea, Lane and Michelle Grabner. “Remain in Light”. Illinois State University, 2008
 Michelle Grabner's Black Circle Paintings, Metalpoint Drawings and Monoprints. Poor Farm Press, 2009.
 Jacob, Mary Jane and Michelle Grabner (eds.). The Studio Reader. Chicago: University of Chicago Press, 2010.
Michelle Grabner: I Work From Home. Museum of Contemporary Art Ceveland. Mousse Publishing, 2014.
Editor, An American City: Front International, two-volume exhibition catalog, published by the Cleveland Museum of Art, 2018.

External links

 The Poor Farm Experiment

University of Wisconsin–Milwaukee alumni
Living people
1962 births
Northwestern University alumni
People from Oshkosh, Wisconsin
American women painters
University of Wisconsin–Madison faculty
Art Institute of Chicago
Painters from Wisconsin
21st-century American women artists
People associated with the Whitney Museum of American Art
American women academics